Maxwell Amponsah (born 9 October 1986) is a Ghanaian professional boxer. As an amateur, he competed at the 2000 Summer Olympics in the heavyweight event.

Amponsah was the flag bearer of Ghana at the opening ceremony. However, he had to withdraw from the Olympic competition due to an unhealed broken jaw.

References

External links
 

1986 births
Living people
Ghanaian male boxers
Light-heavyweight boxers
Olympic boxers of Ghana
Boxers at the 2012 Summer Olympics
Boxers from Accra